Produce 101 Season 2 is a South Korean reality television show.

Contestants
The spelling of name in English are according to the official website. The Korean contestants are presented in Eastern order (family name, given name). The age listed is according to the Korean age system at the start of the competition.

Color key

Group Battle Performances (Episodes 3-4)
Color key

 (*) denotes the team with the highest score who can perform on M Countdown.
 Bold denotes the person who picked the team members.

Position Evaluation Performances (Episodes 6-7)
Color key

(*) Ha Min-ho left the show shortly after the position performances were filmed.

Concept Evaluation Performances (Episode 9)
Color key

Debut Evaluation Performances (Episode 11)
Color key

Notes

References

 
Produce 101 contestants (season 2)
Produce 101 Season 2 contestants
Produce 101 Season 2 contestants
Produce 101 Season 2 contestants
Produce 101 Season 2 contestants